Stewart Harry O'Dell (born November 27, 1951) is a former American football linebacker in the National Football League (NFL) for the Washington Redskins and Baltimore Colts.  He played college football at the Indiana University and was drafted in the thirteenth round of the 1974 NFL Draft. Stu's football career was abruptly interrupted by a serious lower extremity injury.

References

External links
 

1951 births
Living people
American football linebackers
Washington Redskins players
Baltimore Colts players
Indiana Hoosiers football players
People from Linton, Indiana
Players of American football from Indiana